State Route 71 (SR 71) is a  state highway in the U.S. state of California. Serving Riverside, San Bernardino, and Los Angeles counties, it runs from SR 91 in Corona to the Kellogg Interchange with I-10 and SR 57 on the border of Pomona and San Dimas. The segment from SR 91 to SR 83 in Chino Hills is called the Corona Freeway, formerly the Corona Expressway and before then the Temescal Freeway. SR 71 is designated as the Chino Valley Freeway between SR 83 and the Kellogg Interchange.

Route description
Beginning at its southern terminus, SR 91 in Corona, SR 71 is an expressway for a half-mile when it intersects with Pomona Rincon Road. After this intersection, SR 71 becomes a freeway up to Rio Rancho Road before reverting to an expressway up to Mission Boulevard. (previously, it was an expressway until its northern terminus, but this segment was upgraded to a freeway in 2012.) The route becomes a short freeway for about a mile until it meets at the Kellogg Interchange in San Dimas, where it terminates at I-10 and SR 57.                                                  

As of December 2016, all traffic signals were removed. Traffic entering and exiting the roads that lead into the nearby neighborhoods (North Ranch Road, Old Pomona Road, and Phillips Drive) may no longer enter or exit northbound due to added barriers in the highway's median. However, until 2021, southbound traffic could use these streets. (North Ranch Road, Old Pomona Road, and Phillips Drive can enter the highway via a stop sign.) These streets have been completely closed to southbound access as of 2021. Just south of the Mission Boulevard exit, all aspects of the highway, such as its alignment, lane width, pavement, barriers, and access, 'upgrade' to freeway standards.

The section of the highway between Corona and Chino is notorious for thick winter fogs at dawn and dusk, resulting in many automobile collisions when drivers fail to slow down due to reduced visibility. Residents of Los Serranos (now Chino Hills) recall being awakened by sounds of crinkling bumpers, fenders, and headlights.

As this freeway/expressway serves as an important northwest-southeast corridor between the cities in the Pomona and San Gabriel valleys (eastern Los Angeles County) and the cities of western Riverside County, it is heavily traveled. It is used as an alternative to SR 57 (the Orange Freeway) situated to the west and I-15 (the Ontario Freeway) located to the east.

When the route runs through Chino Hills and Chino, there is a high-occupancy vehicle lane available for use; however, this carpool lane ends when the route enters Riverside County (to the south) and Los Angeles County (to the north). The route is a four-lane highway between SR 91 and Central Avenue (excluding HOV lanes), a six-lane highway (excluding HOV lanes) from Central Avenue to SR 60, and again a four-lane highway from SR 60 to I-10/SR 57.

SR 71 is part of the California Freeway and Expressway System, and is part of the National Highway System, a network of highways that are considered essential to the country's economy, defense, and mobility by the Federal Highway Administration. SR 71 is eligible for the State Scenic Highway System; however, it is not designated as a scenic highway by Caltrans.

History
The original routing of SR 71, according to the 1934 listing, was from US 80 (now I-8), in San Diego north to US 66 (now SR 66), near Claremont via Lake Elsinore and Temecula. When the portion between San Diego and Temecula was redesignated US 395, SR 71 was rerouted to run from Pomona to Aguanga. In 1973, it was cut back to its present terminus in Corona, with the portion between Corona and Temecula becoming I-15 and the portion between Temecula and Aguanga becoming SR 79 and SR 371. The early section of the Chino Valley Freeway was built in 1971 from the Kellogg Interchange to SR 60 (the Pomona Freeway). The section from SR 60 to SR 91 (the Riverside Freeway) was completed in March 1998.

In September 2008, construction began on the Mission 71 Project in Pomona. A bridge was constructed to allow Mission Boulevard to pass over SR 71, which now has entrance and exit ramps to Mission. Also, the intersection with Ninth Street was closed. The freeway was extended south to the former intersection at Ninth Street, where it resumes expressway status to the intersection with Old Pomona Road. The construction project was completed in December 2011.

Future
The City of Pomona is currently working with Caltrans to convert the rest of SR 71 within its borders from its current status as a four-lane expressway to a full eight-lane freeway. This project is underway and is expected to be fully complete by 2027. Additionally, the Riverside County Transportation Commission plans to construct a two-lane flyover ramp between eastbound SR 91 and northbound SR 71 to replace the current one-lane loop ramp.

Exit list

See also

References

External links

Caltrans: Route 71 highway conditions
California Highways: Route 71
California @ AARoads.com - State Route 71

071
State Route 071
State Route 071
State Route 071
071
Geography of Pomona, California
Pomona Valley
Chino Hills, California
Corona, California
San Dimas, California
U.S. Route 395